Zelda Barbour Wynn Valdes (June 28, 1901 - September 26, 2001) was an American fashion designer and costumer. She is credited for designing the original Playboy Bunny waitress costumes.

Biography

Introduction 
Zelda Valdes was born Zelda Christian Barbour in Chambersburg, Pennsylvania, and grew up in Charlotte, North Carolina. She trained as a classical pianist at the Catholic Conservatory of Music. In the early 1920s, Valdes started to work in the tailoring shop of her uncle in White Plains, New York. Around the same time, Valdes began working as a stock girl at a high-end boutique. Eventually, she worked her way up to selling and making alterations, becoming the shop's first black sales clerk and tailor. Looking back, Valdes said "It wasn't a pleasant time, but the idea was to see what I could do." Despite the struggles she experienced in her early experiences in the alteration industry, Valdes and her sister, Chez Valdes, would go onto open the first African American owned Manhattan boutique in 1948.

Life 
Beginning in 1935, she had her own dressmaking business in White Plains, New York. She eventually oversaw ladies alterations, and developed her own dressmaking clientele. In 1948, Valdes opened "Zelda Wynn," her design and dressmaking studio, on Broadway (in what is now Washington Heights on Broadway and West 158th Street). Valdes said that her shop was the first black-owned business on Broadway. She sold her dresses to movie star Dorothy Dandridge, opera diva Jessye Norman, and singer Gladys Knight. Valdes also dressed the entire bridal party for the 1948 wedding of Marie Ellington, aka Maria Cole and Nat King Cole. Additional celebrity clients included Josephine Baker, Mae West, Ella Fitzgerald, Eartha Kitt, and Marian Anderson, Constance Bennet, Diahann Carroll, Dorothy Dandridge, Ruby Dee, Aretha Franklin, and Gladys Knight.  Her designing relationship with Fitzgerald was mostly long-distance - she told The New York Times in 1994 that she only fitted Fitzgerald once in 12 years, and did most of her designing for her based on her imagination. Valdes also created a new sexier image for singer Joyce Bryant who LIFE Magazine dubbed "the Black Marilyn Monroe."

In the 1950s, she moved "Chez Zelda" to 151 57th Street in Midtown. She had a staff of nine dressmakers and charged almost $1,000 per couture gown.

Creating the Playboy Bunny Suit 
Her role in glamorizing women caught the attention of Playboy's Hugh Hefner who commissioned Zelda to design bunny costumes for the Playboy Playmates, an idea suggested by Victor Lownes. She created the original Playboy Bunny costume, which was presented at the opening of the first Playboy Club in Chicago, IL on February 29, 1960. It was also the first commercial uniform to be registered by the United States Patent and Trademark Office.

Activism Through Fashion 
Beginning in the 1960s, Valdes directed the Fashion and Design Workshop of the Harlem Youth Opportunities Unlimited and Associated Community Teams (HARYOU-ACT). Valdes taught costume designing skills and facilitated fabric donations to the student workshops.

She was one of the founders of the National Association of Fashion Accessory Designers, an industry group intended to promote black talent in the fashion industry. This group was established with the sponsorship of the National Council of Negro Women.

Death 
In 1970, Arthur Mitchell asked Valdes to design costumes for his new company, the Dance Theatre of Harlem.  By 1992, Valdes would design costumes for eighty-two productions.  She closed her business in 1989 but continued to work with the Dance Theatre of Harlem until her death in 2001 at the age of 100.

See also
 Playboy Bunny
 Dance Theatre of Harlem

References

1905 births
2001 deaths
African-American fashion designers
American fashion designers
American women fashion designers
African-American businesspeople
20th-century American businesspeople
Playboy
20th-century American businesswomen
20th-century African-American women
20th-century African-American people